Mary Boyle is a clinical psychologist. She is a Professor Emeritus at University of East London.

Books 
 Schizophrenia: A Scientific Delusion?, 2nd ed., Routledge, 2002, 
-explores the concept of schizophrenia through the lens of the philosophy of science using concepts from Rudolf Carnap and Lewis White Beck considering the validity of the biological basis for schizophrenia including genetic research. It considers the validity of the DSM's definition of schizophrenia, and considers aspects of the sociology behind its diagnosis and the concept itself following Michel Foucault. It explores alternatives to the diagnosis of schizophrenia.

 Rethinking Abortion: Psychology, Gender and the Law, Routledge, 1997,

Awards
 Fellow of the British Psychological Society
 Fellow of the Royal Society of Medicine
 Fellow of the Royal Society of Arts.

References 

British psychologists
Living people
Academics of the University of East London
Fellows of the British Psychological Society
Year of birth missing (living people)